Nulgubjishin (Hangul: 눌굽지신), also known as Nadgarishin (Hangul: 낟가리신) is the deity of Nulgub, an area where grain are stored and ground into flour, in Korean mythology, as well as being the deity of grain. He is considered the weakest of the Gashin, the household deities of Korean mythology. There is thus no Gut (shamanistic ritual) nor Bonpuli (a biography of a deity) dedicated to Nulgubjishin.

Rite 
The rite dedicated to Nulgubjishin was a short one. In the Gakdobinyeom Ritual, where shamans prayed to all of the Gashin, shamans put food inside a jug and went to the Nulgub. The shaman then prayed to Nulgubjishin to ensure a good grain harvest and the protection of the family from misfortune or Gwishin (evil ghosts). The shaman then placed the food that he brought on the Nulgub with a spoon.

Because he was considered to be the weakest of the Gashin, the rite dedicated to Nulgubjishin was the last rite in the Gakdobinyeom Ritual (First: Munjeonshin, the door god, Second: Chilseongshin, the storage goddess, Third: Jowangshin, the kitchen goddess, Fourth: Obang Shinjang, the directional deities, Fifth: Jumok Jeongsal Jishin, god of the door-like Jeongnang, Sixth: Nulgubjishin, god of grain) There is no myth or story of its shape, about Nulgubjishin.

References

See also 
 Gashin cult, the Korean worship and veneration of household deities

Gasin faith
Korean gods
Agricultural gods